Sook-Yin Lee is a Canadian broadcaster, musician, film director, and actress. She is a former MuchMusic VJ and a former radio host on CBC Radio. She has appeared in films, notably in the John Cameron Mitchell movie Shortbus.

Early and personal life
Lee was born in Vancouver, British Columbia. She was the second daughter of a father from Hong Kong and a mother from Mainland China, Lee was raised as a devout Roman Catholic. Her father was a post-World War II orphan from Hong Kong, and her mother an escapee from Communist China who remained in and out of psychiatric institutions when Lee was young. She grew up within a strict, secretive and unstable family. When Lee was 15, her parents split up and Lee ran away from home, for a time living on the street before eventually living with a "community of lesbians and artists".

In the mid-1980s, she became the lead singer for Bob's Your Uncle, a Vancouver alternative rock band. Lee often incorporated performance art techniques into the band's melodic rock. When that band broke up, Lee pursued a solo music career, releasing several solo albums and performing as an actor in theatre, film and television projects. She was the lead singer for the band Slan. Neko Case covered Lee's song "Knock Loud" on her 2001 EP Canadian Amp.

She was in a relationship with writer and musician Adam Litovitz, who was also her frequent artistic collaborator, from 2007 until 2018. They occasionally performed improvised musical sets under the name LLVK, short for Lee/Litovitz/Valdivia/Kamino, and formed the band Jooj, which released its debut album in 2015. An album of music written by Sook-Yin and Adam was completed in 2020 and was released under the title of jooj two in April 2021 on Mint Records.

She resides in Toronto.

Lee is gender-fluid.

Career

Broadcasting
Lee became a VJ for MuchMusic in 1995, hosting MuchMusic's alternative music show The Wedge.

In 1995, on the day that sexual orientation was held to be protected under section 15 of the Canadian Charter of Rights and Freedoms by the Supreme Court of Canada in the Egan v Canada case, Lee celebrated the decision by kissing a woman on the air. She later appeared on the cover of Xtra! in 1997.

During her last appearance as a MuchMusic VJ in 2001, Lee and her co-host turned their backs to the camera, and mooned the audience on live television.

She became the new host of CBC Radio One's Saturday afternoon pop culture magazine radio-show Definitely Not the Opera in 2002. Definitely Not the Opera completed its run in 2016.

In the fall of 2004, she hosted a documentary celebrating Terry Fox as part of the CBC Television series The Greatest Canadian.

During the Summer of 2008, Lee was a member of the CBC Olympic broadcasting team for the Beijing games. During the games, Lee filmed a TV spot that touched upon concerns regarding human rights and political issues.

In 2016, Lee hosted the 10 episode summer series Sleepover for CBC Radio, which continued as a podcast until 2018.

In 2020, Lee hosted Landscape Artist of the Year Canada, a Canadian adaptation of Landscape Artist of the Year, for Makeful.

Film work
As a feminist, Lee specifically works on films that discuss feminist and/or racial issues. Escapades of One Particular Mr. Noodle (1990) was her debut as a feminist film director. This film was produced by Studio D, a primarily feminist film production company, as one of the short films in their segment Five Feminist Minutes (1990).

Lee played the lead character Alessa Woo, alongside fellow Canadian actor Adam Beach, in Helen Lee's 2001 film The Art of Woo.

Lee also has a smaller part in John Cameron Mitchell's film Hedwig and the Angry Inch, playing Kwahng-Yi, a guitarist in Hedwig's rock band made up of Korean-born army wives.

In 2003, she became the centre of controversy when Mitchell first announced that he was casting Lee in his film Shortbus (released 2006). Due to Mitchell's announcement that the film was to be sexually explicit in nature – Lee and other cast members perform non-simulated intercourse and masturbation on screen – the CBC initially threatened to fire her. In making Shortbus, Mitchell sought to make a film about love and sex without censoring itself. Celebrities such as director Francis Ford Coppola, R.E.M.'s Michael Stipe, actress Julianne Moore and artist and musician Yoko Ono, as well as the CBC's listening audience, rallied behind her, and the CBC ultimately relented. The movie premiered at the 2006 Cannes Film Festival. Her performance in Shortbus earned Lee the 2007 International Cinephile Society Award for Best Supporting Actress.
This was not her first film that explores a sexually explicit nature. She acted in 3 Needles (2005), a short film about HIV and AIDS. The film takes place in various locations around the world - Canada, China, and South Africa - demonstrating the universality of STDs/STIs.

In 2012, she was chosen to play Olivia Chow in the biopic television film Jack, alongside Rick Roberts as Jack Layton. The film aired on CBC Television in 2013. She subsequently won the 2014 Canadian Screen Award for Best Performance by a Lead Dramatic Actress in a Program/Mini-Series.

Lee stars in, wrote and directed The Brazilian segment of the 2008 film Toronto Stories.

Her feature film directorial debut Year of the Carnivore premiered at the Toronto International Film Festival in 2009. Lee, Litovitz and Buck 65 also collaborated on the film's soundtrack, which garnered a Genie Award nomination for Best Original Score at the 31st Genie Awards.

Her second feature film as a director, Octavio Is Dead!, premiered at the Inside Out Film and Video Festival in 2018, and received several Canadian Screen Award nominations at the 7th Canadian Screen Awards.

Theatrical work
In 2013, Lee wrote and starred in a theatrical performance show How Can I Forget? at Toronto's Rhubarb and Summerworks theatre festivals. She and Litovitz also staged Morrice Fled: Two Paintings Talk to Each Other, a pop-up performance at the Art Gallery of Ontario based on the art of James Wilson Morrice, in January.
In 2014, Lee choreographed a dance solo for Syreeta Hector as part of On Display for Toronto Dance Theatre. From 2015 to 2017, she created and directed Sphere of Banished Suffering with dancers Jenn Goodwin, Mairi Greig, and Charlie McGettigan with Litovitz developed in residencies with LUFF art+dialogue, Dancemakers, Artscape Sandbox, and premiered at the Festival of New Dance 2017.

In 2019, she wrote and appeared in Unsafe, a documentary theatre production on the topic of censorship, at Canadian Stage.

Discography
1994 – Lavinia's Tongue (Zulu Records)
1996 – Wigs 'n' Guns (Zulu Records)
2003 – Electric Blues (with Slan, Last Gang Records)
2010 – Original Music from and Inspired by the Movie Year of the Carnivore (with Buck 65 and Adam Litovitz, Last Gang Records)
2015 – JOOJ" (with Adam Litovitz, Last Gang Records)
2018 – Octavio is Dead!" (Original Soundtrack for the Film with Alia O'Brien, and Adam Litovitz, Last Gang Records)
2021 – jooj two (with Adam Litovitz, Mint Records)

Filmography
Five Feminist Minutes (1990) (segment "Escapades of One Particular Mr. Noodle")
Green Dolphin Beat (1994)
Bad Company (1995)
Sliders (1995, TV series)
Boy Meets Girl (1998)
Hedwig and the Angry Inch (2001)
The Art of Woo (2001)
3 Needles (2005)
Shortbus (2006)
Toronto Stories (2008)
Year of the Carnivore (2009)
Jack (2013)
Octavio Is Dead! (2018)

See also
 List of female film and television directors
 List of LGBT-related films directed by women

References

External links
 
 Sook-Yin Lee's profile as host of DNTO at CBC
 Sook-Yin Lee at Queer Media Database Canada-Quebec

Living people
20th-century Canadian actresses
20th-century Canadian women singers
21st-century Canadian actresses
21st-century Canadian screenwriters
21st-century Canadian women singers
21st-century Canadian women writers
Canadian alternative rock musicians
Canadian rock singers
Canadian singer-songwriters
Canadian film actresses
Canadian performance artists
Canadian Roman Catholics
Canadian talk radio hosts
Canadian television actresses
Canadian film directors
Canadian women screenwriters
Bisexual actresses
Bisexual singers
Bisexual songwriters
Bisexual screenwriters
Canadian television personalities
Canadian VJs (media personalities)
Canadian radio hosts
Canadian actresses of Chinese descent
Canadian musicians of Chinese descent
Canadian actresses of Hong Kong descent
Canadian musicians of Hong Kong descent
Canadian LGBT broadcasters
Canadian LGBT singers
Canadian LGBT songwriters
Canadian LGBT screenwriters
Actresses from Vancouver
Canadian non-binary actors
Film directors from Vancouver
Musicians from Vancouver
Writers from Vancouver
CBC Radio hosts
Much (TV channel) personalities
Canadian Screen Award winners
LGBT film directors
LGBT Roman Catholics
1966 births
20th-century Canadian LGBT people
21st-century Canadian LGBT people
Asian-Canadian filmmakers
Canadian bisexual writers